Bechowiec (aka Bechowiec-1) was a Polish World War II submachine gun developed and produced by the underground Bataliony Chłopskie (BCh, Peasants' Battalions) resistance organisation. It was designed in 1943 by Henryk Strąpoć and was  produced in underground facilities in the area of Ostrowiec Świętokrzyski. Its name was coined after the Bataliony Chłopskie organization members who were informally called bechowiec (plural: bechowcy).

History
The gun's designer was Henryk Strąpoć (born 1922), a blacksmith and self-taught amateur gunsmith in the village of Czerwona Góra, Świętokrzyskie Voivodeship. Between 1936 and 1939 years he illegally built four semi-automatic pistols of his own design. During the German occupation of Poland he became a gunsmith for the local Bataliony Chłopskie underground organization. In spring of 1943 he completed a working prototype of his own submachine gun, later named Bechowiec. He later improved the design with a help of Jan Swat, who formerly worked as a  mechanic in the metalworks in Ostrowiec Świętokrzyski.

The headquarters of Opatów BCh district, lacking machine guns, decided to organize a serial production of the Bechowiec. This was possible thanks to the clandestine production of parts for the guns in a metalworks in Ostrowiec Świętokrzyski, without the knowledge of the German administration. These parts were produced there and, from October 1943, smuggled out by workers. Final construction of the guns was done in Strąpoć's village blacksmith shop, with primitive muscle-powered tooling. Barrels were made from scrapped World War I-vintage rifles, but they had to be hand-cut and rebored to 9 mm caliber.

The first two new Bechowiec submachine guns were completed in January 1944. By July 1944, 11 were completed in Czerwona Góra, and at least two more in Jan Swat's workshop in Broniszowice. Some 20 were in production, but as the tide of the war turned, the front lines approached the village. The German presence intensified and forced a halt to the secret firearm production. The unfinished weapons and parts were hidden.

The weapons were distributed among Bataliony Chłopskie and affiliated Ludowa Straż Bezpieczeństwa (People's Security Guard) partisan units, mostly in the area around Opatów. Only one Bechowiec-1 is still in existence; it is currently exhibited in the Polish Army Museum in Warsaw.

The next weapon with this name was the Bechowiec-2, designed and produced from April 1944 by Jan Swat in Broniszowice, and patterned after the Sten gun.

Design

A lack of experience of Strąpoć in machine guns' designing and lack of direct patterns resulted in several original construction features, similar to semi-automatic pistols, and hence the weapon is sometimes referred to as a machine pistol, in spite of a size and general layout closer to a submachine gun. The weapon had no stock and had quite compact dimensions. It used standard German 9mm Parabellum ammunition which could be easily obtained either by purchase from the German soldiers or through armed actions. Three or four last weapons used 7.62×25mm Soviet ammunition, of growing popularity among partisans.

The weapon used a slide, much like an automatic pistol and fired from a closed breech, which added to its accuracy in single-shot mode. It also had an internal hammer and an internal safety device that prevented shooting with a partially opened breech. A breech could be brought back by pulling a transport belt, fixed to a slide under the barrel. The gun had a three-position external safety and firing mode selector.

The weapons had a signature "S.H. w.44" on a left side (Strąpoć Henryk, pattern 1944) and "B.H" on a right side. Production guns were painted black, the surviving exhibit weapon was later polished.

See also
Błyskawica submachine gun

References

 Erenfeicht, Leszek; Krajewski, Piotr G. Bechowiec: zapomniany polski peem (Bechowiec: forgotten Polish SMG) in: Strzał Nr. 9(65)/2008

External links
 Bechowiec: Polish Teenager Makes a Resistance SMG

Submachine guns of Poland
Insurgency weapons
World War II submachine guns
9mm Parabellum submachine guns